Amorgos Sousta  or Σούστα Αμοργού(el) is an anonymous Greek folkloric tune (Sousta or syrtos ).The meter is .

Original form

The original form of the Sousta or syrtos  was popular folk dance in  Amorgos .

See also
Sousta
Trata (dance)

References

Greek music
Greek songs
Year of song unknown
Songwriter unknown
Amorgos